Brian Thomas Randall (12 October 1920 – 4 December 1991) was an Australian rules footballer who played in the VFL from 1941 to 1945 for the Richmond Football Club.

Randall played centre half forward in Richmond's 1943 VFL Grand Final victory. Randall also played in Richmond's 1942 and 1944 losing VFL grand finals too.

Randall coached Echuca Football Club from 1947 to 1950, including their 1948 Echuca Football League premiership.

References 

 Hogan P: The Tigers Of Old, Richmond FC, Melbourne 1996

External links
 
 
 1948 - Echuca District FA Premiers: Echuca FC team photo

1920 births
1991 deaths
Richmond Football Club players
Richmond Football Club Premiership players
Australian rules footballers from Victoria (Australia)
One-time VFL/AFL Premiership players